Year 1018 (MXVIII) was a common year starting on Wednesday (link will display the full calendar) of the Julian calendar.

Events 
 By place 

 Europe 
 January 30 – The Peace of Bautzen: Emperor Henry II signs a peace treaty with Bolesław I the Brave, Duke of Poland, ending the German–Polish War. Poland keeps Lusatia – the Holy Roman Empire keeps Bohemia. With this peace agreement, Bolesław redirects his forces on an offensive against the Kievan Rus'.
 July 22–23 – Battle of the River Bug: Polish forces under Bolesław I defeat Yaroslav the Wise near the River Bug. Yaroslav retreats to Novgorod, abandoning Kyiv.
 July 29 – Battle of Vlaardingen: Henry II sends an army towards Holland to subdue the rebellious Count Dirk III. The Imperial forces are defeated near Vlaardingen.
 August – Ivats, Bulgarian nobleman and rebel leader, is blinded and captured by strategos Eustathios Daphnomeles, confirming Bulgaria's position as part of the Byzantine Empire.
 August 14 – Bolesław I accepts the surrender of Kyiv by the Pechenegs. He reinstates Sviatopolk I as Grand Prince of Kiev.
 Battle of Cannae: The Lombard adventurer Melus of Bari and his Norman mercenaries are decisively defeated by the Byzantine army, led by the Catepan Basil Boioannes.
 October 1 – Battle of Carham: King Malcolm II of Scotland and Owain Foel ("the Bald") of Strathclyde are victorious over either Uhtred the Bold or Eadwulf Cudel, rulers of Bamburgh. The battle confirms Scottish dominance over Lothian.
 Cnut ("the Great"), King of England, travels to Denmark to succeed his brother Harald II on the Danish throne.

 Asia 
 January 22 – Emperor Go-Ichijō of Japan celebrates his coming-of-age ceremony; he is aged 9 at this time.
 November 26 – 19-year-old Fujiwara no Ishi marries her nephew Go-Ichijō, becoming Empress of Japan (Chugu), the third in succession of the daughters of influential court official Fujiwara no Michinaga to become Empress. Michinaga, who sent her to court in March, holds a banquet in celebration.
 December – Goryeo–Khitan War: Khitan forces of the Liao dynasty invade Goryeo (North Korea). Goryeo forces led by General Gang Gam-chan annihilates the Khitan army at Kusong.

 By topic 

 Religion 
 Buckfast Abbey (located near Buckfastleigh) is founded as a Benedictine monastery in England.

Births 
 April 10 – Nizam al-Mulk,  Persian scholar and vizier (d. 1092) 
 August 31 – Jeongjong II, ruler of Goryeo (Korea) (d. 1046)
 Abul Hasan Hankari, Abbasid scholar and jurist (d. 1093)
 Bagrat IV, Georgian king of the Bagrationi dynasty (d. 1072)
 Ermengarde of Anjou, duchess of Burgundy (d. 1076)
 Harthacnut (or Cnut III), king of Denmark (d. 1042)
 Michael Psellos, Byzantine monk and philosopher (approximate date)
 Richilde, countess and regent of Flanders (d. 1086)
 Victor II, pope of the Roman Catholic Church (d. 1057)

Deaths 
 February 24 – Borrell, bishop of Vic (Spain)
 February 25 – Arnulf II, archbishop of Milan
 March 22 – Ali ibn Hammud al-Nasir, caliph of Córdoba
 June 23 – Henry I ("the Strong"), margrave of Austria
 July 7 – Gerberga of Burgundy, duchess of Swabia
 September 25 – Berthold of Toul, German bishop
 October 1 
 Gilbert Buatère, Norman nobleman
 Osmond Drengot, Norman nobleman
 December 1 – Thietmar, bishop of Merseburg (b. 975)
 Abd al-Rahman IV, Umayyad caliph of Córdoba
 Aeddan ap Blegywryd, king of Gwynedd
 Adolf I of Lotharingia, German nobleman
 Aldhun, bishop of Lindisfarne (or 1019)
 Dragomir, ruler of Travunia and Zachlumia 
 Harald II, king and regent of Denmark
 Ivan Vladislav, emperor (tsar) of Bulgaria
 Frederick, German nobleman (b. 974)

References